The Aegean Region is one of the 7 geographical regions of Turkey. The largest city in the region is İzmir. Other big cities are Manisa, Aydın, Denizli, Muğla, Afyonkarahisar and Kütahya.

Located in western Turkey, it is bordered by the Aegean Sea to the west, the Marmara Region to the north, the Central Anatolia Region to the east, and the Mediterranean Region to the south.

Among the four coastal regions, the Aegean Region has the longest coastline.

Subdivision 
Aegean Section
Edremit Area
Bakırçay Area
Gediz Area
İzmir Area
Küçük Menderes Area
Büyük Menderes Area
Menteşe Area
 Inner Western Anatolia Section

Ecoregions 

The ecoregions of this region are all Terrestrial, more specifically Palearctic, and still more so, Mediterranean forests, woodlands, and scrub. Different parts are within the following classifications:
 Aegean and Western Turkey sclerophyllous and mixed forests
 Anatolian conifer and deciduous mixed forests                
 Southern Anatolian montane conifer and deciduous forests

Provinces 

Provinces that are entirely in the Aegean Region:

 Aydın
 İzmir
 Manisa
 Uşak

Provinces that are mostly in the Aegean Region:

 Afyonkarahisar
 Denizli
 Kütahya
 Muğla

Provinces that are partially in the Aegean Region:

 Balıkesir
 Bilecik
 Bursa
 Çanakkale
 Eskişehir

Climate 

The climate of the Aegean Region has a Mediterranean climate at the coast, with hot, dry summers and mild to cool, wet winters and a semi-arid continental climate in the interior with hot, dry summers and cold, snowy winters.

Gallery

See also

 List of regions of Turkey
 Provinces of Turkey

References

 
Regions of Turkey